Yasaman Farmani (born 12 February 1995) is an Iranian footballer who plays as a midfielder for Belgian Women's Super League club Charleroi and the Iran women's national team.

Club career
Farmani has played for Charleroi in Belgium.

International career
Farmani capped for Iran at senior level during the 2022 AFC Women's Asian Cup qualification.

Personal life
Farmani married fellow Iranian footballer Ali Gholizadeh in February 2019. Gholizadeh also plays for Charleroi, representing the club in the Belgian First Division A and has represented the Iranian national team.

References

External links

1995 births
Living people
People from Ardabil
Iranian women's footballers
Women's association football midfielders
R. Charleroi S.C. players
Iran women's international footballers
Iranian expatriate footballers
Iranian expatriate sportspeople in Belgium
Expatriate women's footballers in Belgium